The Birmingham Corporation Water Department was responsible for the supply of water to Birmingham, England, from 1876 to 1974. It was also known as Birmingham Corporation Waterworks Department.

Early History 1808 - 1876

The earliest formal supply of water was offered by the Birmingham Waterworks Company. In 1808 notice of a bill was given in Parliament for a scheme to provide Birmingham with an organised supply of water. It was opposed, and in 1809 a meeting considered the proposal, appointed a committee, and rejected the idea of the waterworks. A second bill was rejected in 1811. It was not until 1826 that Parliament granted powers constituting

The area to be supplied used only the River Tame. The initial supply was intermittent. In 1849, the corporation made an agreement with the company for a constant supply in certain districts. By 1853 a constant supply was universal.

The Grade II listed Birmingham Waterworks Tower at Edgbaston Waterworks was designed by John Henry Chamberlain and built in 1870. There is no connection to the nearby Edgbaston Reservoir, built to feed local canals, a hundred years previously.

Birmingham Corporation Water Department

Early developments

The Birmingham Corporation Act of 1875 empowered Birmingham Corporation to purchase the Birmingham Waterworks Company. The transaction was supervised by the Mayor of Birmingham, Joseph Chamberlain, and completed on 1 January 1876 for the sum of £1,350,000 (equivalent to £ in ). Chamberlain declared to a House of Commons committeeWe have not the slightest intention of making profit... We shall get our profit indirectly in the comfort of the town and in the health of the inhabitants

The rivers Bourne and Blythe, Plant's Brook and Perry Stream were used as sources. The corporation dug six wells at Aston, Short Heath, King's Vale, Perry Barr, Selly Oak (Selly Oak Pumping Station survives), and Longbridge.

By 1891, population growth in the city was causing demand for water to outstrip supply.

Elan aqueduct

The Birmingham Corporation Water Act passed in 1892 authorised the purchase of land in Mid Wales on the upper portion of the Rivers Elan and Claerwen. Three reservoirs on the Elan and three on the Claerwen (collectively the "Elan Valley Reservoirs") were authorised, together with an aqueduct to carry the water to Birmingham. The engineer for the Elan aqueduct scheme was James Mansergh. Construction work started in 1893 and the Elan Valley Railway was built to aid construction. King Edward VII and Queen Alexandra performed the official opening on 21 July 1904 although building works were not completed until near the end of 1906.

The Elan aqueduct discharged into two reservoirs: Frankley Reservoir at Frankley and Bartley Reservoir at Bartley Green.

The capacity of the aqueduct was increased with work starting in 1919.

Later history

Birmingham Corporation Water Department existed until 1974 when, under the Water Act 1973, its responsibilities were transferred to the Severn Trent Water Authority which is now Severn Trent Water.

The city council later took unsuccessful legal action to recover its lost investment.

References

Former water companies of England
Health in Birmingham, West Midlands
Water supply in Birmingham, West Midlands